CN2 may refer to:

 CN2 algorithm for rule induction
 Cyanogen, molecular formula (CN)2
 cn|2, a weather, sports and political news cable channel owned by Time Warner Cable in former Insight Communications territories
 Optic nerve (CN2), second cranial nerve
 Cartoon Network Too, a defunct British channel owned by The WB.